Martín Palermo (born 7 November 1973) is an Argentine football manager and former player who played as a striker. He is the current manager of Platense.

Palermo played for Boca Juniors and the Argentina national team. A prolific goalscorer, he is Boca Juniors' all-time top scorer with 236 goals, and is placed 7th among all-time Primera División top scorers with 227 goals in 408 matches.

Palermo also played in Argentina for Estudiantes de La Plata and in Spain for Villarreal, Real Betis, and Alavés. During his playing career, he was nicknamed Loco and Titán. In a 2008 poll, Boca Juniors fans chose him as the greatest idol in the club's history
In 2012, Carlos Salvador Bilardo recommended him to direct Estudiantes de La Plata "He can direct it, he is a man from the club. Whenever I recommended someone for Estudiantes, with Sabella and Simeone they came out champions"

Club career

Born in La Plata, Palermo began his career at Estudiantes de La Plata and later transferred to Boca Juniors. His good goal average and performances in international matches led European teams Lazio, Real Betis, and Milan to be interested in signing him up. But on 13 November 1999, in a game against Colón, he had a complete tear of the anterior cruciate ligament of his right knee; before leaving and without knowing the seriousness of the injury, he scored his 100th goal in the Argentine First Division.

He took six months to recover from the injury. On 24 May 2000, he returned, playing the last fifteen minutes of the quarterfinal match of the Copa Libertadores against River Plate and scoring a goal, leaving the score at 3–0 to Boca Juniors (the first match had ended 1–2).

With Boca, he scored many goals, particularly against arch-rivals River Plate.

He played in the Intercontinental Cup in 2000, scoring the two goals in Boca's 2–1 victory over Real Madrid, winning the man of the match award and catching the attention of football clubs in Spain.

Spell in Spain
Palermo signed with the up-and-coming team Villarreal of the Spanish La Liga on 19 January 2001 in a €7,600,000 transfer. In his second season with the team on 29 November, after scoring a goal, Palermo stood on a small concrete wall, which collapsed under the weight of Villarreal's fans and broke both the tibia and fibula of his left leg, leading to two months of inactivity. Palermo never regained his form, and after two and half seasons with Villarreal, on 20 August 2003, he left the club.
The following day Palermo signed a contract with Real Betis, but in March 2004, after very little success with the club, he left. Later that month he signed with Alavés of the Spanish second division.

Back to Boca Juniors
On 13 July 2004, after three and a half years of playing in Spain for Villarreal, Real Betis, and Alavés, Palermo returned to Boca Juniors. On 17 December he scored his 100th goal with Boca on the final of the 2004 Copa Sudamericana a 2–0 victory over Bolívar.

Palermo, once again back in top form, remained one of the best scorers in the Argentine league, scoring 11 goals in three consecutive matches (2006 Clausura, 2006 Apertura and top scorer of the 2007 Clausura). During the 2007 Clausura tournament he had several memorable moments, on 25 February he scored a half pitch goal in the last seconds of a 3–1 victory over Independiente and two weeks later, on 10 March, he scored three goals against his former team Estudiantes in a 3–1 Boca victory at La Plata. It was the fourth hat-trick of his career. A game later, on 18 March, he scored a career-high of four goals in the 5–1 victory against Gimnasia de la Plata, Estudiantes de La Plata's arch-rivals.

The following season the 2007 Apertura, he continued to be among the Argentine league top scorers with 13 goals. His best game that season was on 16 September, in a game against Banfield, in which he scored four goals, in the 6–0 Boca victory.

Palermo scored his fifth career hat-trick in a 3–0 Boca Juniors victory, a must-win game played in Jalisco, Mexico, against Atlas on 21 May 2008.

At the beginning of the 2008 Apertura, on 24 August he suffered yet another serious injury, this time he injured his anterior cruciate and tore his medial collateral ligament during the 2–1 victory against Lanús, with an expected recovery period of 5 to 8 months.
After this was known, Argentine coach Alfio Basile said that he had chosen him to play for the national team for the following match in the World Cup qualifiers

Palermo's first goal since his injury came on the fourth game he played, during a 3–1 victory over Huracán on 1 March in the 2009 Clausura; this was Martín Palermo's 195 goal with Boca Juniors, breaking Francisco Varallo record of 194 goals in the professional era. Nearly two months later. on 30 April, Martín scored a bicycle kick goal, which gave him 200 goals with Boca Juniors, in a 3–0 victory against Deportivo Táchira.

During the 2009 Apertura, on 4 October in a game against Vélez Sársfield, Martín Palermo scored a very special goal (a header that traveled around 38.9 meters). This goal  gave him 200 goals in the Argentine First Division and also gave Boca a 3–2 victory.

On 22 July 2010, at 36 years of age, Palermo announced that he had renewed his contract with Boca Juniors for one year and that he will retire at the end of the contract.

Martín Palermo scored his sixth career hat-trick on 19 September 2010 in a 3–1 Boca victory over Colón.

On 13 December 2010, Palermo scored his 300th career goal in the final match of the 2010 Apertura in a 1–1 draw against Gimnasia de La Plata.

On 24 April 2011, Martin scored the third goal of Boca Juniors against Huracán in a 3–0 away win, with that goal Palermo cut a streak of 10 matches without scoring. Then he scored in the next consecutive matches against Independiente, Argentinos Juniors and in the 2–0 victory over River Plate in the Superclasico.

Palermo achieved legendary status in Boca in the last few years, thanks to his many memorable goals for both the club and the Argentina national team. On 12 June 2011, Palermo played his last home match at La Bombonera, after the match Martín was honored by the Boca Juniors and was given several gifts, among them being one of the goal frames of the stadium.

Palermo officially retired from football on 18 June 2011, in a 2–2 draw against his classic rival Gimnasia de La Plata. He provided a headed assistance for Boca's second goal in the last minute of the match, marking the end of a 19-year playing career at senior level.

International career
With the Argentina national football team, Palermo has played fifteen matches and scored nine goals. He is in the Guinness Book of World Records for missing three penalties for Argentina in a single international match against Colombia in the 1999 Copa América; the first penalty rebounded off the crossbar; the second penalty went over; the third was saved by the Colombian goalkeeper, Miguel Calero. Though his international career seemed to be over at the end of 1999, the 2008 Argentine national coach Alfio Basile stated that he had been considering offering Palermo a return to international football and was disappointed that Palermo was injured at the time.

The coach of the 2010 national team, Diego Maradona, recalled Palermo to the national team and introduced him as a substitute in a 2010 World Cup qualifying match against Paraguay after a 10-year exile from the international scene.
A couple of weeks later he was once again called up to play a friendly against Ghana. In this game, Palermo was part of the starting eleven and made the most of it by scoring both of Argentina's goals, resulting in a 2–0 win. Palermo's next match was on 10 October, a 2010 World Cup qualifier against Peru. Palermo sealed a 2–1 victory for Argentina with a 93rd-minute strike, causing Maradona to describe the goal after the game as "one more miracle of Saint Palermo."

On 19 May 2010, Palermo was selected as part of the Argentina national team's 23-man final roster for the 2010 FIFA World Cup in South Africa, Palermo's first World Cup. On 22 June 2010, Palermo played his first World Cup match, coming in as a substitute in the second half of Argentina's final group match against Greece. In the 89th minute, he scored his first ever World Cup goal on a rebound from a shot by Lionel Messi. Argentina won the match 2–0 and finished at the top of their group. This goal also made Palermo the oldest Argentine national footballer to score a goal in World Cup play, an honor previously held by Diego Maradona.

Managerial career

On the 26 November 2012, Palermo was announced as the head coach of Godoy Cruz Antonio Tomba alongside former teammate Roberto Abbondanzieri. Placing fourteenth in the Argentine Primera Division Torneo Inicial and seventh place in the Argentine Primera Division Torneo Final of the recently known as Superliga. As the 2012–13 season ended so did his tenure at the club.

On the 18 April 2014, Palermo was appointed as head coach of Arsenal de Sarandi. He took charge for the 2014–15 season, where the club managed to place in ninth. On 19 April 2015, he announced his departure from the club, resigning from his position.

His next role was with Chilsean side Union Espanola; In his first season, 2016–17, they finished as the runner-up of the Chilean Primera Division. However in his second season, with results suffering the club decided to part ways with Palermo in November 2018.

Palermo returned to management and on 22 January 2019, when he was confirmed as the new manager of Mexican side C.F. Pachuca on a one year deal after Pako Ayestarán resigned. He left at the end of his contract, and did not get another job until November 2020, when he was appointed the manager of Curicó Unido, his time there was largely unsuccessful and nine months later he resigned from his post.

Career statistics

Club
Source:

International
Appearances and goals by national team and year

International goals

Managerial statistics

Honours

Player
Estudiantes
Primera B Nacional: 1994–95

Boca Juniors
Primera División: 1998 Apertura, 1999 Clausura, 2000 Apertura, 2005 Apertura, 2006 Clausura, 2008 Apertura
Copa Libertadores: 2000, 2007
Intercontinental Cup: 2000
Copa Sudamericana: 2004, 2005
Recopa Sudamericana: 2006, 2008

Individual
Primera División top scorer: 1998 Apertura (20 goals, short tournament record), 2007 Clausura
Boca Juniors top scorer: 1998 Clausura, 1998 Apertura, 1999 Clausura, 1999 Apertura, 2000 Apertura, 2004 Apertura, 2005 Clausura, 2006 Clausura, 2007 Clausura, 2007 Apertura, 2008 Clausura, 2009 Clausura, 2009 Apertura, 2010 Clausura, 2010 Apertura, 2011 Clausura
South American Footballer of the Year: 1998
South American Team of the Year: 1998, 2000
Intercontinental Cup Most Valuable Player of the Match Award: 2000
American Golden Shoe: 2007 (shared with Giancarlo Maldonado)
Konex Award Merit Diploma as one of the five best football players of the last decade in Argentina: 2010

Manager
Unión Española
Chilean Primera División: Runner-up 2017

Records and facts
First professional match: 5 July 1992 Clausura. (San Lorenzo 0–0 Estudiantes)
First professional goal: 22 May 1993 Clausura. (Estudiantes 3–0 San Martín de Tucumán)
First International match: 3 February 1999. (Venezuela 0–2 Argentina)
First International goal: 1 July 1999. (Ecuador 1–3 Argentina)
First European professional match: 4 February 2001. (Villarreal 2–0 Alavés)
First European professional goal: 11 February 2001. (Oviedo 1–3 Villarreal)
He is in the Guinness book of records for having missed three penalty kicks in the same match, against Colombia in the 1999 Copa América.
Palermo holds an Italian passport, which enables him to play as a UEFA player.
World Cup debut: 22 June 2010 in a match against Greece in the 2010 World Cup.
Oldest player to score for the Argentina national football team: 36 years and 7 months old, scored the second goal of Argentina's 2–0 win over Greece (This record was previously held by Diego Armando Maradona, who was 33 years old when he scored his last goal in a 1994 World Cup match, also against Greece).
Tied for 5th place of all-time in a career among the Argentine Primera División top scorers with 227 goals (34 with Estudiantes and 193 with Boca Juniors).
1st place among Boca's all-time top scorers with 236 goals, having surpassed the 221 goal mark of Roberto Cherro.
Top scorer in the professional era among Boca's top scorers with 236 Goals. (193 in Primera división Argentine tournaments and 43 in international tournaments)
Boca Junior's top scorer in international matches with 43 goals, 15 more than 2nd place Rodrigo Palacio.

References

External links

 Palermo, Martín at Boca Juniors' official website 
 Palermo, Martín at Historiadeboca.com 
 Argentine Primera statistics at Fútbol XXI  
 Guardian statistics
 
 

1973 births
Living people
Footballers from La Plata
Argentine footballers
Association football forwards
Estudiantes de La Plata footballers
Boca Juniors footballers
La Liga players
Real Betis players
Villarreal CF players
Deportivo Alavés players
Argentina international footballers
Copa Libertadores-winning players
1999 Copa América players
2010 FIFA World Cup players
Argentine Primera División players
Argentine expatriate footballers
Expatriate footballers in Spain
Expatriate football managers in Chile
Argentine expatriate sportspeople in Spain
Argentine people of Italian descent
Argentine people of Sicilian descent
South American Footballer of the Year winners
Argentine football managers
Godoy Cruz Antonio Tomba managers
Arsenal de Sarandí managers
Unión Española managers
Curicó Unido managers
Aldosivi managers
Club Atlético Platense managers
Argentine Primera División managers
Chilean Primera División managers
Liga MX managers
Argentine expatriate football managers
Argentine expatriate sportspeople in Chile